Christine Mary Keates (born 10 October 1951) is a British trade unionist.

Early life
Keates grew up in Stoke-on-Trent and attended Thistley Hough Girls' School, a girls' grammar school now called Thistley Hough Academy, before studying Archaeology and History at the University of Leicester, then completing a Postgraduate Certificate in Education at the University of Birmingham.

Career
From 1974 until 1998, she worked as a teacher in Birmingham.

Keates was active in the National Association of Schoolmasters Union of Women Teachers (NASUWT), becoming the union's Assistant General Secretary in 1998, then Deputy General Secretary in 2001 and General Secretary in 2004.  At the time, she was the only woman to lead any of the ten largest unions in the UK.

As leader of the NASUWT, Keates initially pursued a policy of co-operation with the Labour government, signing a workload agreement, in contrast to the rival National Union of Teachers (NUT).  However, she was highly critical of the Conservative-led governments from 2010 onwards, working with the NUT to oppose changes which she described as an "unparalleled vicious assault" on teachers.

Keates also serves on the General Council of the Trades Union Congress.

References

1951 births
Living people
Alumni of the University of Birmingham
Alumni of the University of Leicester
Schoolteachers from Staffordshire
General Secretaries of NASUWT
Members of the General Council of the Trades Union Congress
People from Penkhull
Women trade unionists